Jorrit de Ruiter (born November 28, 1986 in Amsterdam) was a Dutch internationally elite badminton player who, until September 2015, was member of the Dutch National Badminton Team. After he had played in the 2015 World Championships in Jakarta he decided to put an end to his international career.

De Ruiter was a doubles specialist. Until April 2013 he played the men's doubles together with Dave Khodabux (highest achieved world ranking 32). From that moment on he only played the mixed doubles with Samantha Barning who was his partner in this discipline since 2012 and with whom he achieved world ranking 24 in about a year’s time. In September 2013, Barning got seriously injured, the reason why they couldn’t play a considerable number of tournaments. Therefore, they fell far back on the world ranking. In February 2014 they started to play international tournaments again and came in third place at the European Championships in Kazan, Russia. His highest achieved ranking in the mixed doubles was 16.

De Ruiter trained full-time at the Dutch National Sports Centre Papendal. He was chairman of the athletes council of the Dutch Badminton Association and he has a bachelor's degree in sports marketing at Johan Cruyff University in Amsterdam.

Career
De Ruiter started to play badminton when he was seven years old at the Haarlem Badminton Club Duinwijck for which he played in different leagues until 2005. During this period he also joined the National Badminton Youth Team and 9 times he won a national youth championship (4 times mixed doubles, 3 times men's doubles and 2 times men's singles). In the season 2005/06, he played for the first time in the Premier League at the then premier league club Slotermeer in Amsterdam. One year later he joined the First team of BC Van Zijderveld in Amstelveen. In 2011, he returned to BC Duinwijck. As from the season 2012/13, de Ruiter played in the German premier league as club member of 1. BV Mülheim an der Ruhr. In 2016 he committed himself to BC Duinwijck again where he plays in the Dutch premier league. In March 2018 his team won the national championship in the premier league which is the 25th championship for the club. A year later de Ruiter is present again when his club also wins the final of the premier league season 2018-2019.

Achievements

European Championships 
Mixed Doubles

BWF Grand Prix 
Mixed Doubles

 BWF Grand Prix Gold tournament
 BWF Grand Prix tournament

BWF International Challenge/Series
Men's doubles

Mixed doubles

 BWF International Challenge tournament
 BWF International Series tournament

References 
 
 Personal website

Dutch male badminton players
1986 births
Sportspeople from Amsterdam
Living people